Paul Jean-Baptiste Gasq (30 March 1860 – 28 October 1944) was a French sculptor, born in Dijon.

Life 
His father was a railway employee who was often absent. He began his studies at the School of Fine Arts in Dijon then, in 1879, enrolled at the École des Beaux-Arts in Paris, where he took the Prix de Rome in 1890 and studied there until 1894. He also won a Grand Prix at the Exposition Universelle (1900).

From 1932, he was the curator of the Dijon Museum. In 1935, he was elected a member of the Académie des Beaux-Arts. He died in Paris

Work 

 marble group symbolizing National Education, at the tomb of Eugène Spuller, Père Lachaise Cemetery, Paris, circa 1896
 Medea, Jardin des Tuileries, 1896
 marble and bronze statue of President Marie François Sadi Carnot, Dijon, Place de la Republique, 1899, in collaboration with Mathurin Moreau
 marble group, The Glory of the Generals of the Revolution, at the Pantheon, Paris
 facade allegorical group La Révélation artistique (or Sculpture) at the Grand Palais, Paris, 1900
 Fountaine Subé, (with fellow sculptors Paul Auban and Louis Baralis), Reims, 1906
 architectural bronze Summer and Winter for the Whiteleys department store, Bayswater, London, 1911
 the relief La mobilisation 1914, war memorial in Dijon, 1923
 monumental marine fountain, Square Louise-Michel, Montmartre, Paris, 1932
 L'Electricité on the facade of the Gare de Lyon

References

External links
 

1860 births
1944 deaths
Prix de Rome for sculpture
Artists from Dijon
École des Beaux-Arts alumni
Members of the Académie des beaux-arts
20th-century French sculptors
19th-century French sculptors
French male sculptors
19th-century French male artists